The 13th Directors Guild of America Awards, honoring the outstanding directorial achievements in film and television in 1960, were presented in 1961.

Winners and nominees

Film

Television

D.W. Griffith Award
 Frank Borzage

Honorary Life Member
 Y. Frank Freeman

External links
 

Directors Guild of America Awards
1960 film awards
1960 television awards
Direct
Direct
1960 awards in the United States